Onay is a commune in the Haute-Saône department in the region of Bourgogne-Franche-Comté in eastern France.

It is located 12 km south east of Gray, 60 km east of Dijon and 40 km north west of Besançon, on the route D177.

See also
Communes of the Haute-Saône department

References

Communes of Haute-Saône